Acemya asiatica is a species of bristle fly in the family Tachinidae.

Distribution
Tajikistan.

References

Exoristinae
Diptera of Asia
Fauna of Tajikistan
Insects described in 1963